Rachel Helen Maclean (née Cooke; born 3 October 1965) is a British politician serving as Minister of State for Housing and Planning since 2023. A member of the Conservative Party, she has been the Member of Parliament for Redditch in Worcestershire since 2017.

Maclean served as Parliamentary Private Secretary (PPS) to the Chancellor of the Exchequer, Sajid Javid, from September 2019 until February 2020. Prime Minister Boris Johnson appointed her Parliamentary Under Secretary of State at the Department for Transport in February 2020. She then became Parliamentary Under-Secretary of State for Safeguarding from September 2021, before resigning from the position during the July 2022 government crisis. She then served under Liz Truss as Minister of State for Victims and Vulnerability from September to October 2022. She became a Vice Chairman of the Conservative Party in November 2022, and in February 2023 she was appointed Housing Minister by Rishi Sunak.

Prior to her political career, she worked for the bank HSBC and co-founded technology publishers Packt with her husband.

Early life and education
Rachel Helen Cooke was born on 3 October 1965 in Madras (now Chennai), India, to David and Anthea Cooke (now Kaan). She studied Experimental Psychology at St Hugh's College, Oxford and obtained a master's degree in Work and Occupational Psychology at Aston University. After graduation, she entered a fast track management scheme in 1989 at HSBC which involved working in Australia, Japan and China. In 2005, Maclean founded a publishing company specialising in information technology with her husband, David.

Parliamentary career
Maclean contested the Birmingham Northfield seat in the general election of 2015, finishing second behind the incumbent Labour Party MP Richard Burden. She voted for the United Kingdom (UK) to remain within the European Union (EU) in the June 2016 membership referendum.

In April 2017, Karen Lumley, Conservative MP for Redditch announced that she would not contest her seat in the June snap general election due to ill health. The following month, Maclean was selected to be the Conservative candidate in the election. She won the seat at the election with 23,652 votes and a majority of 7,363 (16.3%). In parliament, she sat on the Business, Energy and Industrial Strategy Committee between September 2017 and June 2018.

In the same year, Maclean also co chaired Andy Street's successful campaign to become the Mayor of the West Midlands. In July, in her maiden parliamentary speech, she commented that her main priority would be 'to fight to protect and strengthen local health services', especially the Alexandra Hospital in Redditch.

In February 2018, Maclean was elected to be the chair of the All-Party Parliamentary Group (APPG) on Women in Parliament. She is also the chair of the APPG on Carers and the APPG on Endangered Species. The following month, she was appointed as a Parliamentary Private Secretary (PPS) within the Home Office.

In March 2019, Maclean voted for then Prime Minister Theresa May's Brexit withdrawal agreement. She supported Michael Gove in the 2019 Conservative Party leadership election. In September 2019, she was appointed as PPS to the Chancellor of the Exchequer, Sajid Javid.

She was the Parliamentary Under Secretary of State at the Department for Transport in the Second Johnson ministry since February 2020.

In September 2021, following the withdrawal of foreign defence forces from Afghanistan and takeover by the Taliban, Maclean was appointed Parliamentary Under Secretary of State (Minister for Safeguarding) at the Home Office. She succeeded Victoria Atkins, who simultaneously became Minister of State for Prisons and Probation at the Ministry of Justice, both ministers adopting cross-Government responsibility for the Afghan resettlement programme and Operation Warm Welcome.

In May 2022, during an interview on Sky News, Maclean suggested some people struggling with rising prices could consider working more hours or getting a better-paid job. She later said her comments were unfairly taken out of context and the "long-term" idea would not work for all households. Maclean said she had received a "torrent of personal attacks" including a death threat.

On 6 July 2022, Maclean resigned from her position as Parliamentary Under-Secretary of State for Safeguarding in protest at Prime Minister Boris Johnson's leadership. Maclean backed Sajid Javid, then Kemi Badenoch, and finally Liz Truss in the July–September 2022 Conservative Party leadership election.

In 2023 she was appointed Minister of State for Housing and Planning by Rishi Sunak.

Personal life
She married David Maclean in 1992. They have three sons and one daughter. She founded 'Skilled and Ready', a charity working with schools to help young people develop skills that businesses look for in their employees.

References

External links

1965 births
Living people
HSBC people
Conservative Party (UK) MPs for English constituencies
UK MPs 2017–2019
UK MPs 2019–present
21st-century British women politicians
Female members of the Parliament of the United Kingdom for English constituencies
Alumni of St Hugh's College, Oxford
21st-century English women
21st-century English people